Erlau is a river of Bavaria, Germany. It flows into the Danube in the village Erlau.

See also
List of rivers of Bavaria

References

Rivers of Bavaria
Bohemian Massif
Rivers of Germany